The Mpemba effect is the name given to the observation that a liquid (typically water) which is initially hot can freeze faster than the same liquid which begins cold, under otherwise similar conditions. There is disagreement about its theoretical basis and the parameters required to produce the effect.

The Mpemba effect is named after Tanzanian schoolboy Erasto Bartholomeo Mpemba (1950–2020) whose story of it in 1963 became highly popularized. The discovery and noted observations of it, however, originate in ancient times, having been said by Aristotle to be common knowledge.

Definition 
The phenomenon, when taken to mean "hot water freezes faster than cold", is difficult to reproduce or confirm because this statement is ill-defined.

Monwhea Jeng has proposed a more precise wording:

"There exists a set of initial parameters, and a pair of temperatures, such that given two bodies of water identical in these parameters, and differing only in initial uniform temperatures, the hot one will freeze sooner."

Even with this definition it is not clear, however, whether "freezing" refers to the point at which water forms a visible surface layer of ice, the point at which the entire volume of water becomes a solid block of ice, or when the water reaches .
The above definition suggests simple ways in which the effect might be observed, such as if a warmer temperature melts the frost on a cooling surface, thereby increasing thermal conductivity between the cooling surface and the water container. Alternatively, the Mpemba effect might not be evident in situations and under circumstances that could at first seem to qualify for it.

Observations

Historical context 
Various effects of heat on the freezing of water were described by ancient scientists such as Aristotle: "The fact that the water has previously been warmed contributes to its freezing quickly: for so it cools sooner. Hence many people, when they want to cool water quickly, begin by putting it in the sun. So the inhabitants of Pontus when they encamp on the ice to fish (they cut a hole in the ice and then fish) pour warm water round their reeds that it may freeze the quicker, for they use the ice like lead to fix the reeds." Aristotle's explanation involved antiperistasis: "...the supposed increase in the intensity of a quality as a result of being surrounded by its contrary quality."

Early modern scientists such as Francis Bacon noted: "Slightly tepid water freezes more easily than that which is utterly cold."

René Descartes wrote in his Discourse on the Method, relating the phenomenon to his vortex theory: "One can see by experience that water that has been kept on a fire for a long time freezes faster than other, the reason being that those of its particles that are least able to stop bending evaporate while the water is being heated."

The Scottish scientist Joseph Black investigated a special case of this phenomenon comparing previously-boiled with unboiled water; the previously-boiled water froze more quickly. Evaporation was controlled for. He discussed the influence of stirring on the results of the experiment, noting that stirring the unboiled water led to it freezing at the same time as the previously-boiled water, and also noted that stirring the very-cold unboiled water led to immediate freezing. Joseph Black then discussed Fahrenheit's description of supercooling of water (although the term supercooling had not then been coined), arguing, in modern terms, that the previously-boiled water could not be as readily supercooled.

Mpemba's observation 
The effect is named after Tanzanian Erasto Mpemba. He described it in 1963 in Form 3 of Magamba Secondary School, Tanganyika, when freezing ice cream mix that was hot in cookery classes and noticing that it froze before the cold mix. He later became a student at Mkwawa Secondary (formerly High) School in Iringa. The headmaster invited Dr. Denis Osborne from the University College in Dar es Salaam to give a lecture on physics. Why?" Mpemba was at first ridiculed by both his classmates and his teacher. After initial consternation, however, Osborne experimented on the issue back at his workplace and confirmed Mpemba's finding. They published the results together in 1969, while Mpemba was studying at the College of African Wildlife Management.

Mpemba and Osborne described placing  samples of water in  beakers in the icebox of a domestic refrigerator on a sheet of polystyrene foam. They ruled out loss of liquid volume by evaporation as a significant factor and the effect of dissolved air. In their setup, most heat loss was found to be from the liquid surface.

Modern experimental work 
David Auerbach has described an effect that he observed in samples in glass beakers placed into a liquid cooling bath. In all cases the water supercooled, reaching a temperature of typically  before spontaneously freezing. Considerable random variation was observed in the time required for spontaneous freezing to start and in some cases this resulted in the water which started off hotter (partially) freezing first.

In 2016, Burridge and Linden defined the criterion as the time to reach , carried out experiments, and reviewed published work to date. They noted that the large difference originally claimed had not been replicated, and that studies showing a small effect could be influenced by variations in the positioning of thermometers: "We conclude, somewhat sadly, that there is no evidence to support meaningful observations of the Mpemba effect."

In controlled experiments the effect can entirely be explained by undercooling and the time of freezing was determined by what container was used.

Philip Ball, a reviewer for Physics World wrote: "Even if the Mpemba effect is real — if hot water can sometimes freeze more quickly than cold — it is not clear whether the explanation would be trivial or illuminating."

Ball pointed out that investigations of the phenomenon need to control a large number of initial parameters (including type and initial temperature of the water, dissolved gas and other impurities, and size, shape and material of the container, and temperature of the refrigerator) and need to settle on a particular method of establishing the time of freezing, all of which might affect the presence or absence of the Mpemba effect. The required vast multidimensional array of experiments might explain why the effect is not yet understood.

In a related study, it was found that freezer temperature also affects the probability of observing the Mpemba phenomenon as well as container temperature does.

Theoretical explanations
While the actual occurrence of the Mpemba effect is a matter of controversy, several theoretical explanations could explain its occurrence. In 2017, two research groups independently and simultaneously found a theoretical Mpemba effect and also predicted a new "inverse" Mpemba effect in which heating a cooled, far-from-equilibrium system takes less time than another system that is initially closer to equilibrium. Lu and Raz yield a general criterion based on Markovian statistical mechanics, predicting the appearance of the inverse Mpemba effect in the Ising model and diffusion dynamics. Lasanta and co-workers predict also the direct and inverse Mpemba effects for a granular gas in a far-from-equilibrium initial state. In this last work, it is suggested that a very generic mechanism leading to both Mpemba effects is due to a particle velocity distribution function that significantly deviates from the Maxwell-Boltzmann distribution. James Brownridge, a radiation safety officer at the State University of New York, has said that supercooling is involved. Several molecular dynamics simulations have also supported that changes in hydrogen bonding during supercooling takes a major role in the process. 
Tao and co-workers proposed yet another possible explanation, on the basis of results from vibrational spectroscopy and modelling with density functional theory-optimized water clusters, they suggest that the reason might lie in the vast diversity and peculiar occurrence of different hydrogen bonds. Their key argument is that the number of strong hydrogen bonds increases as temperature is elevated.  The existence of the small strongly-bonded clusters facilitates in turn the nucleation of hexagonal ice when warm water is rapidly cooled down.

Suggested explanations 
The following explanations have been proposed:

 Microbubble-induced heat transfer: that the process of boiling induced microbubbles in that water that remain stably suspended as the water cools, then act by convection to transfer heat more quickly as the water cools.
Evaporation: The evaporation of the warmer water reduces the mass of the water to be frozen. Evaporation is endothermic, meaning that the water mass is cooled by vapor carrying away the heat, but this alone probably does not account for the entirety of the effect.
 Convection: Accelerating heat transfers. Reduction of water density below  tends to suppress the convection currents that cool the lower part of the liquid mass; the lower density of hot water would reduce this effect, perhaps sustaining the more rapid initial cooling. Higher convection in the warmer water may also spread ice crystals around faster.
 Frost: Has insulating effects. The lower temperature water will tend to freeze from the top, reducing further heat loss by radiation and air convection, while the warmer water will tend to freeze from the bottom and sides because of water convection. This is disputed as there are experiments that account for this factor.
 Solutes: Calcium carbonate, magnesium carbonate and other mineral salts dissolved in water can precipitate out when water is boiled, leading to an increase in the freezing point compared to non-boiled water that contains all the dissolved minerals.
 Thermal conductivity:
 The container of hotter liquid may melt through a layer of frost that is acting as an insulator under the container (frost is an insulator, as mentioned above), allowing the container to come into direct contact with a much colder lower layer that the frost formed on (ice, refrigeration coils, etc.) The container now rests on a much colder surface (or one better at removing heat, such as refrigeration coils) than the originally colder water, and so cools far faster from this point on.
 Conduction through the bottom is dominant, when the bottom of a hot beaker has been wetted by melted ice, and then sticky frozen to it. In context of Mpemba effect it is a mistake to think that bottom ice insulates, compared to poor air cooling properties.
Dissolved gases: Cold water can contain more dissolved gases than hot water, which may somehow change the properties of the water with respect to convection currents, a proposition that has some experimental support but no theoretical explanation.
 Hydrogen bonding: In warm water, hydrogen bonding is weaker.
 Crystallization: Another explanation suggests that the relatively higher population of water hexamer states in warm water might be responsible for the faster crystallization.
 Distribution function: Strong deviations from the Maxwell-Boltzmann distribution results in potential Mpemba effect showing up in gases.

Similar effects 
Other phenomena in which large effects may be achieved faster than small effects are:
 Leidenfrost effect: Lower temperature boilers can sometimes vaporize water faster than higher temperature boilers.

See also 
 Density of water
 Heat capacity
 Water cluster
 Newton’s Law of Cooling

References 
Notes

Bibliography
 
Auerbach attributes the Mpemba effect to differences in the behaviour of supercooled formerly hot water and formerly cold water.
 

 
An extensive study of freezing experiments.

External links 

 
  A possible explanation of the Mpemba Effect
  An analysis of the Mpemba effect. London South Bank University.
  – History and analysis of the Mpemba effect.
  An historical interview with Erasto B. Mpemba, Dr Denis G. Osborne and Ray deSouza
  High school experiment description, with link to experimental results
 
 
  in the University of California Usenet Physics FAQ
 Mpemba Competition - Royal Society of Chemistry
 
 

Physical paradoxes
Thermodynamics
Phase transitions
Unsolved problems in physics
Water physics
Physical phenomena
Hysteresis
1969 in Tanzania
Science and technology in Tanzania